Natalia Ariza Díaz (born 21 February 1991) is a female Colombian football who plays as a defender for Houston Aces.

She was part of the Colombia women's national football team  at the 2012 Summer Olympics. At club level she played for Austin Peay State University.

Her twin sister, Tatiana Ariza, is also a footballer who plays as a defender.

See also
 Colombia at the 2012 Summer Olympics

References

External links
 profile at sports-reference.com
 
 
 Austin Peay State University's Natalia Ariza, Tatiana Ariza sign pro contracts with Houston Aces
 

France 1 - Colombia 0 - Soccer Pool G - London 2012 Olympics - The New York Times
  

1991 births
Living people
Colombian women's footballers
Colombia women's international footballers
Colombian expatriate women's footballers
Footballers from Bogotá
Footballers at the 2012 Summer Olympics
Olympic footballers of Colombia
Women's association football defenders
Expatriate women's soccer players in the United States
Austin Peay Lady Govs soccer players
Twin sportspeople
Colombian twins
21st-century Colombian women